Oppliger is a surname. Notable people with the surname include:

Emanuel Oppliger (born 1975), Australian snowboarder
Patrice Oppliger (born 1963), American academic and cultural critic
Paulo Oppliger (born 1971), Chilean alpine skier

See also
 Oppligen